The SC Technical College System is a statewide network of 16 technical colleges in South Carolina.

Colleges
Aiken Technical College (Aiken)
Central Carolina Technical College (Sumter)
Denmark Technical College (Denmark)
Florence-Darlington Technical College (Florence)
Greenville Technical College (Greenville)
Horry-Georgetown Technical College (Conway)
Midlands Technical College (Columbia)
Northeastern Technical College (Cheraw)
Orangeburg-Calhoun Technical College (Orangeburg)
Piedmont Technical College (Greenwood)
Spartanburg Community College (Formerly Spartanburg Technical College) (Spartanburg)
Technical College of the Lowcountry (Beaufort)
Tri-County Technical College (Pendleton)
Trident Technical College (North Charleston)
Williamsburg Technical College (Kingstree)
York Technical College (Rock Hill)